Thandiwe Mbali Maphumulo (born 24 November 1980), is a South African actress, singer and dancer who was in television serials such as 4Play: Sex Tips for Girls, Uzalo and Is'thunzi.

Personal life
Maphumulo was born on 24 November 1980 in Umlazi, KwaZulu-Nata, South Africa. When she was 13 years of age, her parents passed away. Then she raised with her aunt.

She is married to fellow actor Dumisani Mbebe since 2016, but the relationship dated back to 2009. In 2001 when she was 21 years old, she diagnosed with breast cancer. Then she underwent a mastectomy surgery. However, the cancer returned in 2006.

Career
Apart from acting, she is also a singer, who started the career with the "Shell Road to Fame" talent contest. She worked with a Pretoria stage production company and later moved to Gauteng. Then she worked two weeks in the City of Gold. Then she got the opportunity to perform in the globally acclaimed stage play Umoja – Spirit of Togetherness. Then she made a notable performance in the play The Lion King. During these two theatre performances, she recorded solo songs for both plays.

In 1997, she became the winner of Miss Kaizer Chiefs and then started modeling career. In 2008, she appeared in the SABC2 soap opera Muvhango with the role of "Fikile". In 2010, she joined with the e.tv drama series 4Play: Sex Tips for Girls to play the lead role of "Amira Mokoena". She continued to play the role until 2012 with popularity. After that success, in 2013, she then starred in the miniseries Abangani and telenovela Isibaya both telecast in Mzansi Magic. At the same time, she also appeared in the SABC1 drama Tempy Pushas and played the role "Stella.

In 2015, she appeared in the etv. anthology series eKasi: Our Stories. Then in 2016, she made the recurring role of "Nomonde" in the Mzansi Magic drama Is'thunzi. Then she returned to the second season to reprise her role. During the series, she also worked as the costume designer, script translator, hair and makeup artist. In 2020, she appeared in the Moja Love serial Erased. In 2021, she joined with the serials; Hush Money with the role "Cebile Buthelezi" and in Uzalo with the role "Wenzile Nhlapo". She also acted in the films such as; State Enemy No.1, and Safe Bet.

Filmography

References

External links
 IMDb

1980 births
Living people
South African film actresses
South African television actresses
South African stage actresses